The Shati Valley mine is a large iron mine located in east Libya. With estimated reserves of 3.5 billion tonnes of ore grading 55% iron metal, Shati Valley represents one of the largest iron ore reserves in Libya and in the world.

See also 
List of iron mines

References 

Iron mines in Libya